Thomson Road Grand Prix circuit was a former street circuit at Thomson Road in Singapore. It hosted races from 1961 to 1973 for automobiles under Formula Libre and Australian Formula 2 rules as well as for motorcycles.

During the initial years, the main races for motorcycles and cars were 60 laps long. This was eventually refined into two separate races – a preliminary 20 lap event followed by a 40 lap event.

The first Singapore Grand Prix of 1961 was won by Ian Barnwell in an Aston Martin DB3S while the first Singapore Grand Prix of post-independence Singapore in 1966, which also ran to Formula Libre rules, saw Singaporean Lee Han Seng win in a Lotus 22. The final victory went to Australian Vern Schuppan in a March 722 in 1973.

History

In 1960, a Grand Prix was devised as part of the "Visit Singapore – The Orient Year" campaign to attract tourists to the region as well as to promote the sport. At that time, Singapore lacked a formal racing circuit, and as a result, a new circuit had to be found. The initial suggestion for a street circuit that ran through Thomson, Whitley, Dunearn and Adam Roads was found to be unfeasible due to the massive traffic disruption it would cause to residents. After consideration of other existing circuits, it was decided that a new circuit would be created along the old and new Upper Thomson Road.

In 1962, Yong Nam Kee – who apparently was known as 'Fatso' due to his size – took victory in an E-Type Jaguar. Hong Kong driver Albert Poon – a Macau Grand Prix winner - triumphed in 1963 and 1965, although the 1964 car race was abandoned after 5 laps because of torrential rain. That year's race was also marred by a marshal being killed when a Jaguar flew off the track and hit him.

On 11 April 1966, Singapore hosted its first national grand prix. Singaporean Lee Han Seng won in a Lotus 22, followed by compatriot Rodney Seow in a Merlyn in 1967.

Elfin founder Garrie Cooper won in 1968, but it was New Zealander Graeme Lawrence who became the most successful driver in the history of the event with three successive wins from 1969 to 1971, the second of those triumphs coming behind the wheel of a Ferrari 246T. Another Australian, Max Stewart, won in 1972, with Vern Schuppan taking a March Formula 2 car to victory in the final Singapore Grand Prix of that era in 1973.

Past winners

Characteristics

The circuit starts with the "Thomson Mile", a mile-long stretch along Upper Thomson Road. Halfway through this stretch of road, there was "The Hump", a right hand turn that caused drivers to lift off the ground if they sped past this bend.

The Thomson Road Grand Prix circuit had many challenging features, including the treacherous "Circus Hairpin" bends and the "Snakes" section. In particular, the "Murder Mile" feature of this track derived its name from the fact that many racing accidents occurred along this stretch. Similarly, "Devil's Bend" got its name because it was the most dangerous part of the circuit.

Seven people died due to racing accidents in the 11 years of the Singapore Grand Prix. Two people died during the last two consecutive editions of the Grand Prix, at the 1972 Singapore Grand Prix, Lionel Chan, the nephew of local racing champion Chan Lye Choon, died after falling into a ravine, while in the 1973 race Swiss competitor Joe Huber died after crashing his car into a telegraph pole.

Legacy
The 1974 edition of the Grand Prix was cancelled due to safety concerns. The Singapore Grand Prix would not be held until its revival in 2008, as a Formula One race at the Marina Bay Street Circuit in the country's central business district.

Lap records

The fastest official race lap records at the Thomson Road Grand Prix circuit are listed as:

See also
 Malaysia Grand Prix
 Singapore Grand Prix
 Marina Bay Street Circuit

References

External links
 A video documentary on the 1966 Singapore Grand Prix on YouTube

Motorsport venues in Singapore
Ang Mo Kio
Bishan, Singapore
Novena, Singapore
Singapore Grand Prix
Defunct motorsport venues
Sports venues completed in 1961
20th-century architecture in Singapore